The 1973–74 St. Louis Blues season was the seventh for the franchise in St. Louis, Missouri.  The Blues finished the season with a record of 26 wins, 40 losses and 12 ties for 64 points, placing them in sixth place.  The Blues missed the playoffs for the first time in franchise history.

Offseason

Regular season

Final standings

Schedule and results

Playoffs
The Blues failed to qualify for the playoffs for the first time in franchise history, ending a six season playoff streak.

Player statistics

Regular season
Scoring

Goaltending

Awards and records

Transactions

Draft picks
St. Louis's draft picks at the 1973 NHL Amateur Draft held at the Queen Elizabeth Hotel in Montreal, Quebec.

Farm teams

See also
1973–74 NHL season

References

External links

St. Louis Blues seasons
St. Louis
St. Louis
St Louis
St Louis